Qatruiyeh (also Romanized as Qaţrū’īyeh; also known as Ghatroo’eyeh, Kadrū, Kadrūd, and Qadrūn) is a village in Hotkan Rural District, in the Central District of Ravar county, Kerman Province, Iran. At the 2006 census, its population was 137, in 41 families.

References 

Populated places in Zarand County